Bernardino Ramazzini (4 October 1633 – 5 November 1714) was an Italian physician.

Ramazzini, along with Francesco Torti, was an early proponent of the use of cinchona bark (from which quinine is derived) in the treatment of malaria.  His most important contribution to medicine was his book on occupational diseases, De Morbis Artificum Diatriba ("Diseases of Workers").

Life
Ramazzini was born in Carpi on 4 October 1633 according to his birth certificate. He studied medicine at the University of Parma, where his interest in occupational diseases began.

Career
He was appointed to the chair of theory of medicine at University of Modena in 1682 then served as professor of medicine at the University of Padua from 1700 until his death. He is often called "the father of occupational medicine" 

The first edition of De Morbis was published in 1700 in Modena, the second in 1713 in Padua.

Occupational medicine

His book on occupational diseases, De Morbis Artificum Diatriba (Diseases of Workers) outlined the health hazards of chemicals, dust, metals, repetitive or violent motions, odd postures, and other disease-causative agents encountered by workers in more than fifty occupations.  This was one of the founding and seminal works of occupational medicine and played a substantial role in its development.

He proposed that physicians should extend the list of questions that Hippocrates recommended they ask their patients by adding, "What is your occupation?".

Ramazzini saw prevention as being better than cure. In his Oratio given in 1711, he suggested that "it is much better to prevent than to cure, and so much easier to foresee future harm and avoid it rather than have to get rid of it after having fallen prey".

Malaria
In regards to malaria, Ramazzini was one of the first to support the use of the quinine-rich bark cinchona.  Many falsely claimed that quinine was toxic and ineffective, but Ramazzini recognized its importance.  He is quoted, "It [quinine] did for medicine what gun powder did for war."

Cancer
In 1713, Bernardino Ramazzini said that nuns developed breast cancer at a higher rate than married women, because they did not engage in sexual intercourse, and the "unnatural" lack of sexual activity caused instability of the breast tissues that sometimes developed into breast cancer.

Death
Ramazzini died in Padua on 5 November 1714.

Acknowledgement
In a lifestyle article "Sitting can lead to an early death," the writer acknowledged Ramazzini's pioneering study of this field in the 17th century.

The honor society Collegium Ramazzini is named after him.

References

Works

Bibliography
Essai sur les Maladies de Disseus. Original translation from Latin in "De Mortis Artificum" by M. De Foureau

Franco G, Franco F. Bernardino Ramazzini: The Father of Occupational Medicine. Am J Publ Health 2001;91:1380–1382
Franco G, Fusetti L. A. Bernardino Ramazzini's early observations of the link between musculoskeletal disorders and ergonomic factors. Appl Ergonom 2004;34:67–70.
Franco G. Ramazzini and workers’ voice disorders. Otolaryngol Head Neck Surg 2008;139:329
Franco G. Work-related musculoskeletal disorders. A lesson from the past. Epidemiology 2010;21:577–579
Franco G. Health disorders and ergonomic concerns from the use of microscope: A voice from the past. Am J Clin Pathol 2011; 135:170–171
Franco G. Bernardino Ramazzini and women workers’ health in the second half of the seventeenth century. J Public Health 2012;34:305–308
Franco G. A tribute to Bernardino Ramazzini (1633–1714) on the tercentenary of his death Occ Med 2014;64:2–4
Carnevale F, Iavicoli S. Bernardino Ramazzini (1633–1714): a visionary physician, scientist and communicator. Occup Environ Med 2015;72:2–3.
Franco G. La lezione di Bernardino Ramazzini, medico sociale e scienziato visionario. Acc. Naz. Sci Lett. Arti di Modena - Memorie Scientifiche 2015;18:49–62
Franco G. Prevention is far better than cure - Revisiting the past to strengthen the present: the lesson of Bernardino Ramazzini (1633-1714) in public health. YCP Publisher (2020) (Contents, Preface, Overview)

External links

 Ramazzini Collegium The Collegium supplies information on risks and prevention of injury and disease attributable to the workplace and the environment.
 Some places and memories related to Ramazzini.
 Presentations and publications on Ramazzini's famed work "De Morbis Artificum Diatriba"
 Celebrazioni del tricentenario della morte Bernardino Ramazzini, a pioneer of public health - Presentation given on the occasion of the event “Bernardino Ramazzini, three-centenary from death”. University of Padua, 18 October 2014
 Tercentenary of the death
De fontium mutinensium admiranda scaturigine ; tractatus physico-hydro-staticus. - full digital facsimile at Linda Hall Library
Franco G. Meglio prevenire che curare – il pensiero di Bernardino Ramazzini, medico sociale e scienziato visionario. Narcissus, 2015

1633 births
1714 deaths
University of Parma alumni
Academic staff of the University of Modena and Reggio Emilia
Academic staff of the University of Padua
People from Carpi, Emilia-Romagna
17th-century Italian physicians
18th-century Italian physicians
Malariologists
Italian occupational health practitioners
17th-century Latin-language writers
18th-century Latin-language writers